A chromoprotein is a conjugated protein that contains a pigmented prosthetic group (or cofactor). A common example is haemoglobin, which contains a heme cofactor, which is the iron-containing molecule that makes oxygenated blood appear red. Other examples of chromoproteins include other hemochromes, cytochromes, phytochromes and flavoproteins.

In hemoglobin there exists a chromoprotein (tetramer MW:4 x 16.125 =64.500), namely heme, consisting of Fe++ four pyrrol rings.

A single chromoprotein can act as both a phytochrome and a phototropin due to the presence and processing of multiple chromophores. Phytochrome in ferns contains PHY3 which contains an unusual photoreceptor with a dual-channel possessing both phytochrome (red-light sensing) and phototropin (blue-light sensing) and this helps the growth of fern plants at low sunlight.

The GFP protein family includes both fluorescent proteins and non-fluorescent chromoproteins. Through mutagenesis or irradiation, the non-fluorescent chromoproteins can be converted to fluorescent chromoproteins. An example of such converted chromoprotein is "kindling fluorescent proteins" or KFP1 which was converted from a mutated non-fluorescent Anemonia sulcata chromoprotein to a fluorescent chromoprotein.

Sea anemones contain purple chromoprotein shCP with its GFP-like chromophore in the trans-conformation. The chromophore is derived from Glu-63, Tyr-64 and Gly-65 and the phenolic group of Tyr-64 plays a vital role in the formation of a conjugated system with the imidazolidone moiety resulting a high absorbance in the absorption spectrum of chromoprotein in the excited state. The replacement of Tyrosine with other amino acids leads to the alteration of optical and non-planer properties of the chromoprotein. Fluorescent proteins such as anthrozoa chromoproteins emit long wavelengths 

14 chromoproteins were engineered to be expressed in E. coli for synthetic biology. However, chromoproteins bring high toxicities to their E. coli hosts, resulting in the loss of colors. mRFP1, the monomeric red fluorescent protein, which also displays distinguishable color under ambient light, was found to be less toxic. Color-changing mutagenesis on amino acids 64–65 of the mRFP1 fluorophore was done to acquire different colors.

References 

Biological pigments
Proteins